Days of Twang is an album by De-Phazz, released on 23 March 2007.

Track listing

References

De-Phazz albums
2007 albums